

Films

References

Works cited

Notes

Director filmographies